The Stanford Cardinal are the athletic teams that represent Stanford University. As of June 2022, Stanford's program has won 131 NCAA team championships, the most of any university. Stanford has won at least one NCAA team championship each academic year for 46 consecutive years, starting in 1976–77 and continuing through 2021–22. Stanford won 25 consecutive NACDA Directors' Cups, from 1994–95 through 2018–19, awarded annually to the most successful overall college sports program in the nation.  177 Stanford-affiliated athletes have won a total of 296 Summer Olympic medals (150 gold, 79 silver, 67 bronze), including 26 medals at the 2020 Tokyo games. Stanford's teams compete at the National Collegiate Athletic Association (NCAA) Division I (Football Bowl Subdivision (FBS) for college football) level as a member of the Pac-12 Conference, along with other schools from the western third of the United States.

Nickname and mascot history

Cardinal red was chosen as Stanford's official color by an assembly of the university's first students in 1891. White was adopted as a secondary color in the 1940s.

Following Stanford's win over California in the first-ever Big Game on March 19, 1892, the team was metonymically referred to as the "Cardinal" by sportswriters in the next day's San Francisco Chronicle. The university's athletic teams continued to be referred to as the "Cardinal" or "Cardinals" even after the adoption of the "Indians" name.

On November 25, 1930, following a unanimous vote by the Executive Committee for the Associated Students, the athletic department adopted the mascot "Indian".

On March 3, 1972, a few months after the football team's second straight win in the Rose Bowl, the Indian symbol and name were dropped by Stanford president Richard Lyman after objections from Native American students and a vote by the student senate.

From 1972 to 1981, the official nickname returned to "Cardinals," a reference to the color, not the bird. During the 1970s, a number of suggestions were put forth as possible nicknames: Robber Barons (a sly reference to Leland Stanford's history), Sequoias, Trees, Railroaders, Spikes, Huns and Griffins. The last suggestion gained enough momentum to prompt the athletics department to move two griffin statues from the site of the former Stanford Home for Convalescent Children to near the athletic facilities.

On November 17, 1981, school president Donald Kennedy declared that the athletic teams be represented by the color cardinal in its singular form.

Stanford has no official mascot, but the Stanford Tree, a member of the Stanford Band wearing a self-designed tree costume, appears at major Stanford sports events. The Tree is based on El Palo Alto, a redwood tree in neighboring Palo Alto that appears in the Stanford seal and athletics logo.

Sports sponsored

Stanford University sponsors 36 varsity sports teams — 15 men's, 20 women's, and two coed sports — competing primarily in the NCAA Division I and the Pac-12 Conference. The rowing program competes in the Intercollegiate Rowing Association, the men's and women's gymnastics, men's volleyball, men's and women's water polo, and women's lacrosse all compete in the Mountain Pacific Sports Federation, the field hockey program competes in the America East Conference, sailing in the Intercollegiate Sailing Association, squash program in the College Squash Association, and the synchro program in the USA Synchro.

In July 2020, due to increased financial constraints caused by the COVID-19 pandemic, Stanford Athletics announced they will be eliminating 11 varsity teams after the conclusion of the 2020–2021 academic year: men's and women's fencing, field hockey, lightweight rowing, men's rowing, co-ed and women's sailing, squash, synchronized swimming, men's volleyball and wrestling. These planned cuts were canceled in May 2021.

Football

Basketball

Baseball

The Cardinal have appeared in the NCAA Division I baseball tournament 31 times, and appearing in the College World Series 16 times.  They have won two National Championships, in 1987 and 1988.

Field Hockey

Men's golf
The men's golf team has won nine NCAA Championships: 1938, 1939, 1941, 1942 (co-champions), 1946, 1953, 1994, 2007, 2019. They have crowned three individual national champions: Sandy Tatum (1942), Tiger Woods (1996), and Cameron Wilson (2014). They have won 11 Pac-12 Conference championships: 1960, 1968, 1970, 1974, 1977 (south), 1992, 1994, 2014, 2015, 2016, 2019. Other notable players include Tom Watson, Bob Rosburg, NFL quarterback John Brodie, and Notah Begay III.

Women's golf
In 1971 Shelley Hamlin won the women's national intercollegiate individual golf championship (an event conducted by the Division of Girls' and Women's Sports, which evolved into the current NCAA women's golf championship). In 2015, Stanford won the team title in the first match play championship. In 2021, Rachel Heck won the NCAA individual title. In 2022, Rose Zhang won the NCAA individual title, and Stanford won the team title.

Sailing
Stanford Sailing has won the 1997 Intercollegiate Sailing Association (ICSA) Team Race Championship, the ICSA Men's Singlehanded Championship in 1963, 1967, and 2006, and the ICSA Women's Singlehanded Championship in 2000 and 2018.

In March 2019, John Vandemoer, Stanford University's head sailing coach for 11 years, pleaded guilty to one count of conspiracy to commit racketeering for accepting bribes in the 2019 college admissions bribery scandal, to hold open admission spots at the university for three applicants falsely portrayed as competitive sailors, in exchange for $770,000 in payments to the sailing program. Unlike others indicted in the scheme, he did not personally benefit financially. The university fired Vandemoer.  Clinton Hayes was appointed interim head coach.

Men's soccer

The Cardinal have appeared in the NCAA Division I Men's Soccer Tournament 14 times since their inaugural season in 1973, including 11 times in the 20 seasons from 1997 to 2016.  They have seven appearances in the College Cup, including winning the 2015, 2016, and 2017 national championships.

Women's soccer

The Cardinal won the NCAA women's soccer championship in 2011, 2017, and 2019.

Softball 

The Cardinal softball team has appeared in two Women's College World Series, in 2001 and 2004. The Cardinal program was the co-champions of the PAC-10 conference in 2005, which is their only conference championship. The current head softball coach of the Stanford program is Jessica Allister.

Men's tennis
The Cardinal have won 17 NCAA Men's tennis championships: 1973, 1974, 1977, 1978, 1980, 1981,1983, 1986, 1988, 1989, 1990, 1992, 1995, 1996, 1997, 1998, 2000.

Women's tennis
The Cardinal have won 20 of the 38 NCAA Women's tennis championships that have taken place: 1982, 1984, 1986, 1987, 1988, 1989, 1990, 1991, 1997, 1999, 2001, 2002, 2004, 2005, 2006, 2010, 2013, 2016, 2018, and 2019.
Stanford has won more than half of all the NCAA women's tennis
championships that have been held, and this has been true in every year
except 1983, 1985, 2015, and 2017, when Stanford had won exactly half. Donna Rubin won the deciding doubles match which secured the 1978 AIAW championships, and in 1980 she was named an All-American.

Women's volleyball 

The Cardinal have won 9 NCAA Women's volleyball national championships: in 1992, 1994, 1996, 1997, 2001, 2004, 2016, 2018 and 2019.
Stanford appeared in the first 39 NCAA tournaments, failing to qualify for the postseason for the first time during the 2020–21 season. Only Penn State has appeared in more. Stanford has won 9 NCAA championships, the most of any team, and has appeared in 17 championship games, more than any other team.

Wrestling
The Stanford wrestling team is coached by Rob Koll, replacing Jason Borelli after he took the head coaching job at American University in 2021. In his 13 years as head coach, Borelli led the Cardinal to 122 dual wins, making him Stanford's winningest coach. The Cardinal wrestlers practice in the Weintz Family Wrestling Room, and compete on campus at Burnham Pavilion, with a capacity of about 1,400. The Cardinal Wrestling team have placed in the top 20 at the NCAA Division I Wrestling Championships in 1967 (13th), 2004 (19th), 2008 (19th), 2011 (11th), and 2012 (16th). The team finished third in the Pacific Coast Conference placings in 1933 and 1935, second in the AAWU in 1965, third in the Pacific-10 Conference in 1985 and 1986 second in the Pac-10 in 2008, and third in the Pac-12 in 2012.

Stanford has two national champions in its history: Matt Gentry at 157 pounds in 2004 and Shane Griffith at 165 pounds in 2021.

Stanford's wrestling program was one of the eleven the school planned on eliminating after the 2020–21 season. In response, the team wore solid black singlets without the school logo. Wrestling fans also led a movement to keep the program afloat before the school reversed its decision.

Notable non-varsity sports

Rugby

Stanford has fielded a college rugby team since 1906, and replaced football entirely until 1917. Stanford achieved one of the most surprising victories of American rugby's early history by beating a touring Australian club team in 1912. Rugby remained a varsity sport at Stanford until 1977. Despite the loss of varsity status, the Stanford Rugby Foundation covers many of the team's expenses from an endowment fund. Rugby is one of the largest sports programs on campus with over 100 players. Stanford Rugby is led by Director of Rugby Matt Sherman, who has served as an assistant coach for the U.S. men's national team.

From 1996 to 1998 Stanford reached the national semifinals in three consecutive years, finishing second in 1998.  During the 2010–11 season, Stanford was champion of the Northern California conference, reached the national quarterfinals, and finished the season ranked 4th in D1-AA rugby. Following the 2011–12 season, Stanford were promoted to Division 1-A and played in the California conference, but have since returned to Division 1-AA and now play in the Pacific Western conference. Stanford won the Pacific Western conference in 2014, earning a berth in the D1-AA national playoffs, where they defeated Oregon 24–12 at home in front of a strong crowd, before losing to Arizona 27–24 in the quarterfinals.

Championships

NCAA team championships

Stanford has won 131 NCAA team national championships, the most of any Division 1 school in the NCAA. Stanford has won these NCAA team championships in 20 different sports.

Men's (69)
Baseball  (2): 1987, 1988
Basketball  (1): 1942
Cross country (4): 1996, 1997, 2002, 2003
Golf † (9): 1938, 1939, 1941, 1942, 1946, 1953, 1994, 2007, 2019
Gymnastics  (8): 1992, 1993, 1995, 2009, 2011, 2019, 2021, 2022
Outdoor track & field (4): 1925 (unofficial), 1928, 1934, 2000
Soccer (3): 2015, 2016, 2017
Swimming (8): 1967, 1985, 1986, 1987, 1992, 1993, 1994, 1998
Tennis  (17): 1973, 1974, 1977, 1978, 1980, 1981, 1983, 1986, 1988, 1989, 1990, 1992, 1995, 1996, 1997, 1998, 2000
Volleyball  (2): 1997, 2010
Water polo  (11): 1976, 1978, 1980, 1981, 1985, 1986, 1993, 1994, 2001, 2002, 2019
Women's (62)
Basketball (3): 1990, 1992, 2021
Cross country (5): 1996, 2003, 2005, 2006, 2007
Golf (2): 2015, 2022
Rowing  (1): 2009
Soccer  (3): 2011, 2017, 2019
Swimming (11): 1983, 1989, 1992, 1993, 1994, 1995, 1996, 1998, 2017, 2018, 2019
Tennis (20): 1982, 1984, 1986, 1987, 1988, 1989, 1990, 1991, 1997, 1999, 2001, 2002, 2004, 2005, 2006, 2010, 2013, 2016, 2018, 2019
Volleyball  (9): 1992, 1994, 1996, 1997, 2001, 2004, 2016, 2018, 2019
Water polo  (8): 2002, 2011, 2012, 2014, 2015, 2017, 2019, 2022
† The NCAA started sponsoring the intercollegiate golf championship in 1939, but it retained the titles from the 41 championships previously conferred by the National Intercollegiate Golf Association in its records.

Other national team championships
Below are 39 national team titles in NCAA sports that were not bestowed by the NCAA:
Men's (17)
Basketball (1): 1937 (retroactive Helms and Premo-Porretta selectors)
Football (2): 1926, 1940
Tennis (1): 1942 ‡
Tennis (12) (indoor): 1973, 1975, 1976, 1978, 1985, 1990, 1992, 1994, 1995, 1998, 2000, 2002 (ITA)
Water polo (1): 1963 (coaches' poll)
Women's (22)
Rowing (9) (lightweight): 2010, 2011, 2012, 2013, 2015, 2016, 2017, 2018, 2019 (IRA)
Swimming (1): 1980 (AIAW)
Tennis (1): 1978 (AIAW)
Tennis (10) (indoor): 1989, 1990, 1993, 1998, 2000, 2001, 2004, 2005, 2006, 2011 (ITA)
Water polo (1): 1985 (USA Water Polo)
‡ Unofficial by virtue of winning both the collegiate individual and doubles crowns of the U.S. Lawn Tennis Association

Below are 42 national team titles won by Stanford varsity and club sports teams at the highest collegiate levels in non-NCAA sports:
Men's (5)
Rugby (1) (Div. II): 2002
Sailing, offshore large boats (2): 1967, 1968
Ultimate (2): 1984, 2002
Women's (24)
Archery (2) (recurve): 2006, 2007
Rugby (4): 1999, 2005, 2006, 2008
Synchronized swimming (9): 1998, 1999, 2005, 2006, 2007, 2008, 2013, 2016, 2021 (USA Synchro collegiate championships)
Table tennis (1): 2006
Ultimate (8): 1997, 1998, 1999, 2003, 2005, 2006, 2007, 2016
Combined (13)
Badminton (3): 1997, 1998, 1999
Canoe/Kayak (4) (flatwater): 2002, 2003, 2004, 2005
Cycling (4) (road): 1995, 1996, 1997, 2007
Sailing (1) (team race): 1997 (ICSA)
Taekwondo (1): 2013

Consecutive years winning NCAA team championships
Stanford has won at least one NCAA team championship each academic year for 46 consecutive years, starting in 1976–77 and continuing through 2021–22. This is the longest such streak in NCAA history. The second-longest NCAA championship streak ever was 19 years, achieved by USC from 1959–60 through 1977-78. As of June 2022, the second-longest active streak is four years.

The most NCAA team championships Stanford has won in a single year is six in 1996–97 (men's and women's cross-country, men's and women's tennis, and men's and women's volleyball) and again in 2018–19 (men's golf and gymnastics and women's volleyball, swimming, tennis and water polo). Stanford has won five NCAA team championships in a year three times (1991–92, 1994–95, and 1997–98). In the 2019–2020 academic year, when collegiate athletics were cut short because of COVID, only seven NCAA team championships were held, all in fall sports, and Stanford won three of them.

Stanford has won two NCAA team championships in a single day three times: in men's and women's cross-country on November 25, 1996; in men's and women's cross-country on November 24, 2003; and in men's water polo and women's soccer on December 8, 2019.

NCAA individual championships
Stanford athletes have won 529 NCAA individual championships as of January 1, 2022.

Stanford's 529 individual championships are the most individual championships won by any school in NCAA Division I. No other Division I school is within 100 of Stanford's total.

Directors' Cups
Stanford won the NACDA Directors' Cup in 25 consecutive academic years, from 1994–95 through 2018-19. Stanford was the runner-up in 1993–94 and 2020–21, the other two years the Directors' Cup has been awarded.

The Directors' Cup recognizes the most successful overall sports program in NCAA Division I. It is awarded annually by the National Association of Collegiate Directors of Athletics (NACDA). The Directors' Cup rewards broad-based success in both men's and women's college sports. Points are awarded based on post-season success in NCAA-sponsored sports.

Stanford finished second in the first Directors' Cup competition in 1993–94, behind North Carolina. Stanford won its first Directors' Cup the following year, 1994–95. From 1994–95 through 2018-19, Stanford won 25 Directors' Cups in a row. When the Directors' Cup was next awarded, in 2020-21, Stanford finished second, behind Texas.

Athletic facilities
Arrillaga Center for Sports and Recreation — Fencing, squash
Arrillaga Family Rowing and Sailing Center — Men's and women's rowing, Women's lightweight rowing, sailing
Avery Aquatic Center — Men's and women's swimming and diving, women's synchronized swimming, men's and women's water polo
Burnham Pavilion — Men's and women's gymnastics, wrestling
Cobb Track and Angell Field — Men's and women's track and field
Klein Field at Sunken Diamond — Baseball
Maloney Field at Laird Q. Cagan Stadium — Men's and women's soccer, women's lacrosse
Maples Pavilion — Men's and women's basketball,  men's and women's volleyball
Red Barn — Equestrian
Smith Family Stadium — Softball
Stanford Beach Volleyball Stadium — Beach volleyball
Stanford Golf Course — Men's and women's cross country, men's and women's golf
Stanford Stadium — Football
Taube Tennis Center — Men's and women's tennis
Varsity Field Hockey Turf — Women's field hockey

Rivals

The Cardinal's rivals consist of California, Notre Dame, San Jose State, and USC, which all primarily evolved from American football.

Olympics representation
Stanford athletes have traditionally been very well represented at the Summer Olympics. 175 Stanford-affiliated athletes have won a total of 296 Summer Olympic medals (150 gold, 79 silver, 67 bronze). In the 2008 Beijing Olympics, Stanford sent 47 current or former student athletes, 32 of whom competed for the United States, 14 for other countries, and one as a coach for the United States softball team. In all, Stanford athletes won 25 medals: For the 2012 London Olympics, 39 athletes were from Stanford and 26 represented Team USA. Stanford athletes won 27 medals at the 2016 Rio de Janeiro games and 26 medals at the 2020 Tokyo games.

Stanford does not compete at the varsity level in any events contested at the Winter Olympics. Stanford students and alums who have won Winter Olympic medals include John Coyle, Eileen Gu, Eric Heiden, Sami Jo Small, and Debi Thomas.

Stanford Athletics Hall of Fame
The Stanford Athletics Hall of Fame was established on December 21, 1954. Envisioned by Walt Gamage, sports editor of the now-defunct Palo Alto Times, the first class of inductees consisted of 34 Stanford sports greats. New members are inducted annually and are recognized during halftime of a home Stanford football game. The Stanford Athletics Hall of Fame Room is located on the first floor of the Arrillaga Family Sports Center on the Stanford campus.

See also
2019 college admissions bribery scandal

References

External links

 
Sports in Stanford, California